BitchX  is a free IRC client that has been regarded as the most popular ircII-based IRC client. The initial implementation, written by "Trench" and "HappyCrappy", was a script for the IrcII chat client. It was converted to a program in its own right by panasync (Colten Edwards). BitchX 1.1 final was released in 2004. It is written in C and is a TUI application utilizing ncurses. GTK+ toolkit support has been dropped. It works on all Unix-like operating systems, and is distributed under a BSD license. It was originally based on ircII-EPIC, and eventually it was merged into the EPIC IRC client. It supports IPv6, multiple servers and SSL, and a subset of UTF-8 (characters contained in ISO-8859-1) with an unofficial patch.

On several occasions, BitchX has been noted to be a popular IRC client for Unix-like systems.

The latest official release is version 1.2.

BitchX does not yet support Unicode.

Security 
It was known that early versions of BitchX were vulnerable to a denial-of-service attack in that they could be caused to crash by passing specially-crafted strings as arguments to certain IRC commands. This was before format string attacks became a well-known class of vulnerability.

The previous version of BitchX, released in 2004, has security problems allowing remote IRC servers to execute arbitrary code on the client's machine (CVE-2007-3360, CVE-2007-4584).

On April 26, 2009, Slackware removed BitchX from its distribution, citing the numerous unresolved security issues.

The aforementioned vulnerabilities were fixed in the sources for the 1.2 release.

See also 

Comparison of Internet Relay Chat clients
 Internet Relay Chat
 Internet Relay Chat Client

References

External links

 
 
 
 

Unix Internet Relay Chat clients
Free Internet Relay Chat clients
Internet Relay Chat clients
Free software programmed in C